The United Kingdom participated in the Eurovision Song Contest 2007 with the song "Flying the Flag (For You)" written by Russ Spencer, Morten Schjolin, Andrew Hill and Paul Tarry. The song was performed by the group Scooch. The British entry for the 2007 contest in Helsinki, Finland was selected via the national final Eurovision: Making Your Mind Up 2007, organised by the British broadcaster BBC. Six acts competed in the national final and the winner was selected through two rounds of public televoting.

As a member of the "Big Four", the United Kingdom automatically qualified to compete in the final of the Eurovision Song Contest. Performing in position 19, the United Kingdom placed 22nd out of the 24 participating countries with 19 points.

Background

Prior to the 2007 contest, the United Kingdom has participated in the Eurovision Song Contest forty-nine times. Thus far, the United Kingdom has won the contest five times: in 1967 with the song "Puppet on a String" performed by Sandie Shaw, in 1969 with the song "Boom Bang-a-Bang" performed by Lulu, in 1976 with the song "Save Your Kisses for Me" performed by Brotherhood of Man, in 1981 with the song "Making Your Mind Up" performed by Bucks Fizz and in 1997 with the song "Love Shine a Light" performed by Katrina and the Waves. To this point, the nation is noted for having finished as the runner-up in a record fifteen contests. Up to and including 1998, the UK had only twice finished outside the top 10, in 1978 and 1987. Since 1999, the year in which the rule was abandoned that songs must be performed in one of the official languages of the country participating, the UK has had less success, thus far only finishing within the top ten once: in 2002 with the song "Come Back" performed by Jessica Garlick. For the 2006 contest, the United Kingdom finished in nineteenth place out of twenty-four competing entries with the song "Teenage Life" performed by Daz Sampson.

The British national broadcaster, BBC, broadcasts the event within the United Kingdom and organises the selection process for the nation's entry. BBC announced that the United Kingdom would participate in the Eurovision Song Contest 2007 on 16 October 2006. BBC has traditionally organised a national final featuring a competition among several artists and songs to choose the British entry for Eurovision. For their 2007 entry, the broadcaster announced that a national final involving a public vote would be held to select United Kingdom's entry.

Before Eurovision

Eurovision: Making Your Mind Up 2007 

Eurovision: Making Your Mind Up 2007 was the national final developed by the BBC in order to select the British entry for the Eurovision Song Contest 2007. Six acts competed in a televised show on 17 March 2007 held at the Maidstone Studios in Maidstone, Kent and hosted by Terry Wogan and Fearne Cotton. The winner was selected entirely through a public vote. The show was broadcast on BBC One. The first part of the national final was watched by 5.1 million viewers in the United Kingdom with a market share of 22.6%, while the second part was watched by 5.6 million viewers in the United Kingdom with a market share of 25.7%.

Competing entries 
Entries were provided to the BBC by record labels and music industry experts including writers, producers, artist managers and artists themselves. Among the acts rumoured by British media to have been consulted by the BBC with for entry submissions and involvement in the national final included Ace of Base, 2006 British representative Daz Sampson with Carol Decker, Morrissey, Queentastic, Scissor Sisters and The Puppini Sisters. Six finalists were selected to compete in the national final, which were announced during a press conference on 28 February 2007.

Final 
Six acts competed in the televised final on 17 March 2007. In addition to their performances, the guest performer was previous Eurovision Song Contest winner Lordi, who won the contest for Finland in 2006 with the song "Hard Rock Hallelujah".

A panel of experts provided feedback regarding the songs during the show. The panel consisted of John Barrowman (actor, dancer, singer and television presenter) and Mel Giedroyc (actress, comedian and television presenter). The winner was selected over two rounds of public televoting. In the first round, "I'll Leave My Heart" performed by Cyndi and "Flying the Flag (For You)" performed by Scooch were selected to proceed to the second round. In the second round, the winner, "Flying the Flag (For You)" performed by Scooch, was selected.

Controversy 
During the winner's announcement of the national final, Terry Wogan revealed the winner to be Cyndi while Fearne Cotton simultaneously revealed the winner to be Scooch. Many people believed Cyndi was the winner as Wogan's announcement was louder than Cotton's, however it was confirmed seconds later that Scooch were the winners. The BBC would later issue a written apology, blaming the blunder on "live TV". 

Fourth-placed act Justin Hawkins, who left the venue following the results announcement of the first voting round, later accused viewers for being "racist or stupid" for not voting for his song and third-placed act Big Brovaz due to the race of the group and his duet partner Beverlei Brown. Accusations were also made by Hawkins and sixth-placed act Brian Harvey that Scooch had "duped the public into voting" for them by failing to show their two backing vocalists on stage with the purpose of boosting their performance. The BBC later issued a statement clarifying that all finalists had "followed EBU rules to the letter" and that "having off-camera supporting singers occurs regularly in TV shows and especially the Eurovision".

At Eurovision
According to Eurovision rules, all nations with the exceptions of the host country, the "Big Four" (France, Germany, Spain and the United Kingdom) and the ten highest placed finishers in the 2006 contest are required to qualify from the semi-final in order to compete for the final; the top ten countries from the semi-final progress to the final. As a member of the "Big Four", the United Kingdom automatically qualified to compete in the final on 12 May 2007. In addition to their participation in the final, the United Kingdom is also required to broadcast and vote in the semi-final on 10 May 2007.

In the United Kingdom, the semi-final was broadcast on BBC Three with commentary by Paddy O'Connell and Sarah Cawood, while the final was televised on BBC One with commentary by Terry Wogan and broadcast on BBC Radio 2 with commentary by Ken Bruce. The British spokesperson, who announced the British votes during the final, was Fearne Cotton.

Final 

Scooch took part in technical rehearsals on 7 and 8 May, followed by dress rehearsals on 11 and 12 May. During the running order draw for the semi-final and final on 12 March 2007, the United Kingdom was placed to perform in position 19 in the final, following the entry from Ukraine and before the entry from Romania. The British performance featured the members of Scooch, joined by two backing vocalists, performing on a predominantly red, white and blue coloured stage which featured cabin-style props including refreshment trolleys, metal detectors, suitcases and airplane seats, with the LED screens displaying flying white planes and dots. The United Kingdom placed twenty-second in the final, scoring 19 points.

Voting 
Below is a breakdown of points awarded to the United Kingdom and awarded by the United Kingdom in the semi-final and grand final of the contest. The nation awarded its 12 points to Turkey in the semi-final and the final of the contest.

Points awarded to the United Kingdom

Points awarded by the United Kingdom

References

External links
 BBC Radio 2 - Eurovision: Making Your Mind Up 2007 - Official Site

2007
Countries in the Eurovision Song Contest 2007
Eurovision
Eurovision